FC Korsholm is a football club from Korsholm, the mainly Swedish-speaking municipality that surrounds the city of Vaasa, in Finland. The club was formed in 1998 and their home ground is at the Botniahalli, Sepänkylän keskusurheilukenttä.  The men's first team currently plays in the Kolmonen (Third Division).

Background
FC Korsholm was founded in 1998 with the concept of enabling the promising young players of Korsholm to have the opportunity to develop their football potential as a team and as individuals in their own local club. They were very fortunate to begin their initiative at a high level in the Kakkonen by taking over IF Hoppet, a team from Helsingby, Korsholm. Who used to play their home games at "Gryton".

FC Korsholm has played 2 seasons in the Ykkönen (First Division), the second tier of Finnish football in the period 2002 to 2003.  They also have had eight spells in the third tier, the Kakkonen (Second Division), from 1998 to 2001, 2004 to 2006 and in 2010.

Season to season

Club Structure
FC Korsholm runs 2 men's teams and 1 veteran's side, the Old Boys.  The club does not currently have a junior section.

2010 season
FC Korsholm Men's Team were competing in Group C (Lohko C) of the Kakkonen administered by the Football Association of Finland  (Suomen Palloliitto) .  This is the third highest tier in the Finnish football system. In 2009 Korsholm finished in first position in their Kolmonen (Third Division) section and were promoted to the Kakkonen.

 FC Korsholm Young Boys are participating in the Vitonen (Fifth Division) section administered by the Vaasa SPL.

References and sources
Official Website
Finnish Wikipedia
Suomen Cup

Footnotes

Football clubs in Finland
Korsholm
Association football clubs established in 1998
1998 establishments in Finland